Derek H A Lodge (1929 – July 1996) was an English civil servant who was most notable for his publications about various cricket subjects.

Derek Lodge was born in Lewisham, the second of three brothers. He worked for the Civil Services's Office of Arts and Librarians until his retirement in 1989 and later worked for two charities. A keen road runner, he completed eleven marathons, including the London Marathon on several occasions. He served as a Chiltern District councillor in Buckinghamshire rising to deputy leader and was also a lay preacher in Amersham.

He built a reputation as a compiler of cricket quiz questions and also edited the "Middlesex Annual Review" for several years. He served as the statistical officer (1974–1996) and as vice-chairman (1992–1996) of the Cricket Society.

He died from cancer in Amersham  in July 1996, aged 67, leaving a widow and three daughters. The Council of Cricket Societies named its quiz trophy, the Derek Lodge Cup in his memory.

Bibliography
Figures on the Green, Allen & Unwin, 1982, 
Question of Cricket, Unwin Paperbacks, 1983, 
The Test Match Career of Ted Dexter, Spellmount Publishers Ltd, 1989, 
The Test Match Career of Walter Hammond,  Nutshell Publishing, 1990, 
J.B. Hobbs, The Association of Cricket Statisticians and Historians, 1991, 
P.B.H. May: His Record Innings-by-Innings (Famous Cricketers), The Association of Cricket Statisticians and Historians, 1995,  
D.G. Bradman (Famous Cricketers), The Association of Cricket Statisticians and Historians, 1996,

External links
 The Association of Cricket Statisticians and Historians
 Middlesex County Cricket Club
 The Cricket Society

1929 births
1996 deaths
British civil servants
Cricket historians and writers
Deaths from cancer in England
People from Lewisham